Benjamin Weider,  (1 February 1923 – 17 October 2008) was a Canadian soldier, author, historian (Napoleonic history), fitness proponent, benefactor of the arts, and entrepreneur. He co-founded the International Federation of BodyBuilders (IFBB) alongside his brother Joe Weider. The Weiders also founded many successful businesses including gyms, nutritional supplements and magazines such as Muscle & Fitness.

He wrote several books about Napoleon, including best seller The Murder of Napoleon, translated to 45 languages.

Family

Benjamin Weider was born 1 February 1923 in the old Jewish immigrant quarter ("the Main") of Montréal (Quebec, Canada), the third son of Louis and Anna Weider, Polish Jewish emigrants from the town of Kurów (Poland). Ben left school at 13 to work in restaurants and factories.

Military service
In 1942, he enlisted in the Canadian Army, serving in the 6th Duke of Connaught's Royal Canadian Hussars, in which he did intelligence work. Ben Weider served in the Canadian Army during World War II.

Fitness business
Weider and his brother, started a mimeographed magazine (Your Fitness) to promote weightlifting and sell exercise equipment, which expanded into other titles including Flex, Muscle & Fitness, Men's Fitness, and Fit Pregnancy. The magazines were sold in 2003 to American Media.

The brothers are attributed with creating bodybuilding as a sport, where the focus was on the form and fitness of the body shaped by the exercise. In 1965 the brothers formed the first Mr Olympia contest at the Brooklyn Academy of Music (New York City, New York, United States), an alternative to the Mr. Universe competition.

In 1968, the brothers brought Arnold Schwarzenegger, who was then an unknown Austrian bodybuilder, to California.

He co-founded the International Federation of BodyBuilding & Fitness (IFBB) along with brother Joe Weider, and was its president until he announced his retirement on 29 October 2006. He also co-founded (1936) and ran a physical fitness and sporting goods business from Montreal with his brother, which bears their family name.

Ben Weider opened a number of gyms around the world, including in Lebanon.

Historical research
Weider was known as an advocate of the theory that Napoleon was assassinated with arsenic poisoning by a member of his entourage during his exile in Saint Helena. Weider had even obtained authenticated Napoleon hair samples and arranged for forensic tests that showed that Napoleon had been poisoned with arsenic.   He co-authored several Napoleonic history books including, Assassination at St. Helena, Assassination at St. Helena Revisited and The Murder of Napoleon. The Murder of Napoleon became one of the best-selling history books of all time, now with editions in 45 languages.

Weider also founded the International Napoleonic Society, of which he was the president, and wrote numerous articles for this organization.

Weider owned an extensive collection of Napoleon memorabilia. He donated this collection to the Montreal Museum of Fine Arts, making it one of the largest collections of its kind in the world.

In 2006, the Weider History Group, a wholly owned subsidiary of Weider Health and Fitness Inc, acquired Civil War Times in an acquisition of eleven history-related magazines from another magazine chain, along with America's Civil War, Armchair General, Civil War Times, Vietnam, etc. These acquisitions caused controversies over a change in editorial direction, including the resignation of the Civil War Timess editor (Chris Lewis), and general criticisms of anti-Palestine bias.

Religion
Weider was a Jewish Anglophone. He financially assisted the rebuilding of Montreal's Mary, Queen of the World Cathedral. Jean-Claude Turcotte, the Roman Catholic Cardinal, said of him that Ben Weider was "One of the greatest Montrealers I ever knew".

Awards
Weider was made a Member of the Order of Canada in 1975 (subsequently promoted to Officer in 2006), a Knight of the National Order of Quebec in 2000, a Knight of the French Legion of Honor on 12 October 2000 (for his research work into Napoleon's death), a member of the Quebec Sports Hall of Fame, and a Commander of the Venerable Order of St. John (for his charitable work promoting youth fitness and health worldwide). In 1984, Ben Weider was also nominated for a Nobel Peace prize. The Revolutionary and Napoleonic Studies program of Florida State University's History Department created the Ben Weider Eminent Scholar Chair in Napoleonic History and the Ben Weider Chair of French Revolutionary History, supported by Weider's bequests.

From 1998 to 2005, Weider was Honorary Lieutenant Colonel of the 62nd (Shawinigan) Field Artillery Regiment, RCA.  In 2005, he was promoted to Honorary Colonel of that military unit.

In 2003, he received the first Lifetime Achievement Award from Club Industry's Fitness Business Pro in 2003.

In 2008, he was given the Lifetime Achievement Award at the 20th Anniversary Arnold Classic.

Death
Weider died on October 17, 2008, at the Jewish General Hospital in Montreal.

In popular culture
A movie called Bigger was released in 2018 on the life of Ben Weider and his brother Joe Weider.

Published works

Books
 Weider B., and Forshufvud S., Assassination At St. Helena: The Poisoning of Napoleon Bonaparte (1978). 
 Weider B., and Hapgood D. The Murder of Napoleon (1982). 
 Weider, B., and Kennedy, R. Superpump!: Hardcore Women's Bodybuilding (1986). 
 Weider, B. and Forshufvud, S. Assassination at St. Helena Revisited (1995). 
 Weider, B. The Murder of Napoleon (1998).
 Weider, B. Louis Cyr: Amazing Canadian (2000). 
 Weider, B., Weider, J., and Gastelu, D., The Edge (2002). Weider, B. Napoleon: The Man that Shaped Europe (2003). 
 Weider B., Weider J., Schwarzenegger A., Brothers of Iron: Building the Weider Empire (2006) 
 Franceschi, M., and Weider B. Wars Against Napoleon: Debunking the Myth of the Napoleonic Wars (2007).

Journal articles
 Weider B., and Fournier J.H., Activation analyses of authenticated hairs of Napoleon Bonaparte confirm arsenic poisoning (1999).
 Weider B., and Fournier J., The Death of Napoleon (1999).

See also
 Jake Wood (bodybuilding)

References

External links

 Ben Weider's last interview with Carol Off of CBC Radio 'As It Happens', discussing his multi-million dollar donation of Napoleon artifacts to the Montreal Museum of Fine Arts, broadcast September 25, 2008 (move time slider to 20 mins, 45 secs to start)
 IFBB Professional League for interest in professional bodybuilding, health and fitness
 International Napoleonic Society website
 Mexico-France Napoleonic Institute official website
 Ben Weider Memorial of the Fellow-Members of Honor of the International Napoleonic Society  (in French)
 Brothers of Iron: How the Weider Brothers Created the Fitness Movement and Built a Business Empire by Joe Weider and Ben Weider, with Mike Steere, published by Sports Publishing L.L.C., 2006
 
 Pillar of Achievement mention in the International Jewish Sports Hall of Fame.
Ben Weider: Canadian Casts Doubt on French History

1923 births
2008 deaths
Anglophone Quebec people
Bodybuilding
Businesspeople from Montreal
Canadian Jews
Canadian people of Polish-Jewish descent
Canadian sports businesspeople
Recipients of the Legion of Honour
Knights of the National Order of Quebec
Officers of the Order of Canada
Commanders of the Order of St John
Sportspeople from Montreal
Strength training writers
Canadian Army personnel of World War II
6th Duke of Connaught's Royal Canadian Hussars
Royal Canadian Hussars